George M! is a Broadway musical based on the life of George M. Cohan, the biggest Broadway star of his day who was known as "The Man Who Owned Broadway."  The book for the musical was written by Michael Stewart, John Pascal, and Francine Pascal. Music and lyrics were by George M. Cohan himself, with revisions for the musical by Cohan's daughter, Mary Cohan.

The story covers the period from the late 1880s until 1937 and focuses on Cohan's life and show business career from his early days in vaudeville with his parents and sister to his later success as a Broadway singer, dancer, composer, lyricist, theatre director and producer.  The show includes such Cohan hit songs as "Give My Regards To Broadway", "You're a Grand Old Flag", and "Yankee Doodle Dandy."

Productions
The musical opened on Broadway at the Palace Theatre on April 10, 1968, and closed on April 26, 1969, after 433 performances and 8 previews. The show was produced by David Black and directed and choreographed by Joe Layton. The cast featured Joel Grey as George M. Cohan, Bernadette Peters, Jill O'Hara, Jamie Donnelly, and Betty Ann Grove.

The play was profiled in the William Goldman book The Season: A Candid Look at Broadway.

A television adaptation, presented as a staged reading of the musical with the performers discussing Cohan's life and work between rehearsal-style song-and-dance routines, was broadcast by NBC on September 12, 1970. Grey and Peters were joined by Jack Cassidy, Nanette Fabray, Anita Gillette, and Blythe Danner.

Synopsis
Act I

Jerry and Nellie Cohan waste no time adding their young son to their travelling vaudeville act, "The Four Cohans", with sister Josie.  By the time George is 20, they are playing the Columbia Theatre in Cedar Rapids, and George has landed an audition for the family with impresario E. F. Albee.  But Albee doesn't make a good enough offer, and George books the act into the Adams Street Theatre in New York.  There they meet singer Ethel Levey, and soon George and Ethel get married.  Now George is determined to move "The Five Cohans" from vaudeville to musical comedy, and so he writes his first full-length show, The Governor's Son.  The musical is a flop, but George is undeterred and opens his next show, Little Johnny Jones.  After a momentary crisis of confidence, the company is on stage as George begins the song "Give My Regards to Broadway".  By the time the song is over, the Yankee Doodle Kid is a hit.

Act II

George's career soars higher and higher.  He is now a producer, and he and his partner, Sam H. Harris sign Fay Templeton to appear in their show, and we hear some of Cohan's most famous songs, "Mary", "Forty-Five Minutes from Broadway", and "So Long Mary".  Ethel feels neglected by her high-flying husband, and the two are divorced.  George is crushed, but later meets Agnes Nolan from the cast of Little Johnny Jones.  Soon they are married and, together with Agnes, George writes some of his most enduring work, including the songs "Yankee Doodle Dandy", "Harrigan", "Over There", and "You're a Grand Old Flag."  But George loses family members, and Broadway is changing – actors are unionizing, and Actors Equity is making demands.  George first resists evolving and then retreats from the stage for many years. Eventually, though, Harris offers him a role in I'd Rather Be Right, and, lonely for the stage, he accepts.  But his old style is no longer right for 1937, and George is used to being the boss, not just another actor.  On stage, alone, George remembers his former glory, singing "Give My Regards to Broadway."  He can still tap, after all, and his wife Agnes joins him to reprise "Yankee Doodle Dandy" before he leaves the theatre – at least he's on Broadway.

Songs

Act I
 Musical Moon—Jerry Cohan and Nellie Cohan
 Oh, You Wonderful Boy—Josie Cohan
 All Aboard for Broadway—George M. Cohan and Four Cohans
 Musical Comedy Man—Four Cohans and Full Company
 All Aboard for Broadway (Reprise) – Four Cohans and Full Company
 I Was Born in Virginia—Ethel Levey
 Twentieth Century Love—Four Cohans and Ethel Levey
 My Town—George M. Cohan
 Billie—Agnes Nolan
 Push Me Along in My Pushcart—Ethel Levey and Pushcart Girls
 Ring to the Name of Rose—Josie Cohan and Bell Ringers
 Popularity—Willie and Full Company
 Give My Regards to Broadway—George M. Cohan and Full Company

Act II
 Forty-five Minutes from Broadway—George M. Cohan and Rose
 So Long, Mary—George M. Cohan, Sam Harris, Rose, Freddie and Ma Templeton
 Down by the Erie—Secretary, Politicians, Little Girl in Templeton scene and Full Company
 Mary Is a Grand Old Name—Fay Templeteon
 All Our Friends—Sam Harris and Full Company
 Yankee Doodle Dandy—George M. Cohan and Full Company
 Nellie Kelly I Love You—George M. Cohan and Full Company
 Harrigan—George M. Cohan and Full Company
 Over There—George M. Cohan and Full Company
 You're a Grand Old Flag—George M. Cohan and Full Company
 The City—Full Company
 I'd Rather Be Right—George M. Cohan and Company
 Give My Regards to Broadway (Reprise) – George M. Cohan
 Dancing Our Worries Away—Full Company
 The Great Easter Sunday Parade—Full Company
 Hannah's a Hummer—Full Company
 Barnum and Bailey Rag—Full Company
 The Belle of the Barber's Ball—Full Company
 The American Ragtime—Full Company
 All in the Wearing—Full Company
 I Want to Hear a Yankee Doodle Tune—Full Company

Characters and original cast
George M. Cohan – Joel Grey
Jerry Cohan (George's father) – Jerry Dodge
Ethel Levey (George's first wife) – Jamie Donnelly
Nellie Cohan (George's mother) – Betty Ann Grove
Agnes Nolan (George's second wife) – Jill O'Hara
Josie Cohan (George's sister) – Bernadette Peters
Fay Templeton – Jacqueline Alloway
Sam Harris (producer) – Harvey Evans

Critical response
William Goldman wrote about this production in his 1968 book The Season: "Everybody knew how bad George M! was, in spite of Joe Layton's directing work. The show had its troubles on the road...the problem all along was to try to warm up the central figure. George M! was one of the two most painful productions of the season..."

Clive Barnes, reviewing for The New York Times, wrote that while the musical "has a lot going for it", it was "burdended" by its book. "The musical is a scrappy, ill-prepared mediocrely written account of George M. Cohan..." He praised the use of many of Cohan's songs, and praised Joel Grey's performance: "Sharp as a whiplash, either with his derby tilted down to his nose, ... or his arms thrown out...he danced with a frenetic passion, and a God-given sense of timing..." He also praised Joe Layton's choreography: "the dancing is as good, if not better as any in town."

Awards and nominations
Source: Playbill

 1969 Tony Award Winner for Best Choreography, Winner, Joe Layton
 1969 Tony Award for Best Actor in a Musical, nominee, Joel Grey
 1968 Theatre World Award Winner, Bernadette Peters
 1968 Outer Critics Circle Award for Outstanding Musical, Winner
 1968 Outer Critics Circle Award for Outstanding Performance, Winner, Joel Grey
 1971 Emmy Award Nomination for Outstanding Directorial Achievement in Comedy, Variety or Music (TV adaptation: Walter C. Miller & Martin Charnin)

References

External links
 
  
 Tams-Witmark plot details
 Information guidetomusicaltheatre.com
 Profile of the show from BroadwayMusicalHome.com
  (archive)

1968 musicals
1970 in American television
1970 television specials
1970s American television specials
Biographical musicals
Broadway musicals
George M. Cohan
Musicals by Michael Stewart (playwright)
Musical television films
Musical television specials
Tony Award-winning musicals